Tanambogo is an islet in the Central Province of the Solomon Islands. It is one of the Florida Islands.

History
The first recorded sighting by Europeans was by the Spanish expedition of Álvaro de Mendaña on 16 April 1568. More precisely the sighting was due to a local voyage done by a small boat, in the accounts the brigantine Santiago, commanded by Maestre de Campo Pedro Ortega Valencia and having Hernán Gallego as pilot.

World War II
Along with the nearby island of Gavutu, it played an important role in the Guadalcanal campaign during World War II. In 1942 the Japanese attempted to establish a seaplane base on the island. On 7–9 August 1942, in the Battle of Tulagi and Gavutu–Tanambogo, elements of the U.S. 2nd Marine Regiment assaulted and occupied the island.

References

Islands of the Solomon Islands